Greece competed at the 1972 Summer Olympics in Munich, West Germany. 60 competitors, 58 men and 2 women, took part in 46 events in 9 sports. Greek athletes have competed in every Summer Olympic Games.

Medalists

Athletics

Men's 400 metres hurdles
Stavros Tziortzis
 Final — 49.66 (→ 6th place)

Men's 400 metres
Kyriakos Onisiforou
 Quarterfinals — 47.22 (→ did not advance)

Men's 1500 metres
Spilios Zacharopoulos
 Heat — 3:43.8
 Semifinals — 3:43.5 (→ did not advance)

Men's High Jump
Vassilios Papadimitriou 
 Qualifying Round — 2.15m
 Final — 2.15m (→ 12th place)

Ioannis Koussoulas
 Qualification Round — 2.12m (→ did not advance)

Boxing

Men's Light Middleweight (– 71 kg)
Evengelos Oikonomakos
 First Round — Bye 
 Second Round — Defeated Nicolas Aquilino (PHI), 5:0  
 Third Round — Lost to Dieter Kottysch (FRG), 0:5

Fencing

Three fencers, all men, represented Greece in 1972.

Men's foil
 Andreas Vgenopoulos

Men's épée
 Panagiotis Dourakos
 Andreas Vgenopoulos

Men's sabre
 Ioannis Khatzisarantos

Sailing

Open

Shooting

Five male shooters represented Greece in 1972.
Open

Swimming

Men

Women

Water polo

Pool B

 Team Roster
 Dimitrios Konstas
 Georgios Theodorakopoulos
 Evangelos Voultsos
 Kyriakos Iossifidis
 Dimitrios Kougevetopoulos
 Periklis Damaskus
 Thomas Karalogos
 Ioannis Karalogos
 Efstathios Sarantos
 Ioannis Palios
 Panagiotis Michalos

Weightlifting

Men

Wrestling

References

Nations at the 1972 Summer Olympics
1972 Summer Olympics
Olympics